James Timothy McCarver (October 16, 1941 – February 16, 2023) was an American catcher in Major League Baseball (MLB) television sports commentator who played from  to  for four teams, spending almost all of his career with the St. Louis Cardinals and Philadelphia Phillies, and singer. A two-time All-Star, he helped the Cardinals to the 1964 World Series title, batting .478 in the Series, including a three-run home run in the tenth inning to win Game 5. In 1966, he became the first catcher since the 19th century to lead the National League (NL) in triples with 13. McCarver was runner-up for the  NL Most Valuable Player Award, behind teammate Orlando Cepeda, after batting .295 and leading NL catchers in assists and fielding percentage.

Traded to the Phillies after the 1969 season, he was later re-joined by pitcher and St. Louis teammate Steve Carlton, becoming his regular catcher as the team won three division titles from 1976 to 1978. After increased use as a pinch hitter in his last several seasons, in September 1980, McCarver became the 18th major league player to play in four decades.

After his playing career, McCarver became a television color commentator, most notably for Fox Sports after previous stints with the other three broadcast networks. He eventually set a record by calling 23 World Series as well as 20 All-Star Games, earning three Emmy Awards in the process. In 2012, McCarver was named the Ford C. Frick Award recipient. He was inducted into the Sports Broadcasting Hall of Fame in 2016, and the St. Louis Cardinals Hall of Fame in 2017.

Playing career

Early life
McCarver was born in Memphis, Tennessee, where he attended Christian Brothers High School. He was signed by the St. Louis Cardinals in 1959. After playing in the minor leagues with the Keokuk Indians and the Rochester Red Wings, McCarver reached the Major Leagues for the first time at 17.

McCarver spent the 1960 season with the Memphis Chicks, the 1961 season with the Charleston Charlies, and the 1962 season with the Atlanta Crackers, receiving brief promotions to the major leagues in the 1960 and 1961 seasons. In 1963, he was promoted to the Major Leagues for good.

St. Louis Cardinals
McCarver hit the tie-breaking home run in the 10th inning, winning Game 5 of the 1964 World Series for the Cardinals. In 1966, McCarver was named to the All-Star Team, scored the winning run in the 10th inning of that 1966 All-Star Game, and became the first catcher to lead the National League in triples, with 13. In 1967, he finished second to teammate Orlando Cepeda for the National League Most Valuable Player award.

McCarver was a member of two World Series champion teams in St. Louis. He was the favorite catcher of the notoriously temperamental Bob Gibson, and he fostered a relationship with young pitcher Steve Carlton that would keep him in the Major Leagues later in his career. In 1968, McCarver was the Cardinals catcher as they won the NL pennant but were ultimately defeated by the Detroit Tigers in a seven-game World Series.

Later career
After the 1969 season, the Cardinals traded McCarver, Curt Flood, Joe Hoerner, and Byron Browne to the Philadelphia Phillies for Dick Allen, Cookie Rojas, and Jerry Johnson. On June 14, 1972, the Phillies traded McCarver to the Montreal Expos for John Bateman. The Expos used McCarver as an outfielder. The Cardinals re-acquired McCarver from the Expos for Jorge Roque after the 1972 season. The Boston Red Sox purchased McCarver from the Cardinals towards the end of the 1974 season. The Red Sox released McCarver in June 1975. He signed with the Phillies a week later.

During his first stint with the Phillies, McCarver caught Rick Wise's no-hitter on June 23, 1971. At the end of the season, the Phillies traded Wise to the Cardinals for Steve Carlton, reuniting McCarver with his former teammate. During the 1972 season, the Phillies traded McCarver to the Montreal Expos, where, on October 2, he caught the second of Bill Stoneman's two career no-hitters. McCarver finished his career as Carlton's personal catcher for the Phillies in the late 1970s.

McCarver retired after the 1979 season to begin a broadcasting career. McCarver briefly returned to duty in September 1980, becoming one of 31 players to appear in Major League games in four decades (1950s–1980s).

He caught 121 shutouts during his career, ranking him 9th all-time.

Broadcasting career
After retiring from playing, McCarver worked in sports broadcasting as a color commentator for several decades. He won three Emmy Awards for Sports Event Analyst.

Local broadcasts
He began his broadcasting career at WPHL-TV (Channel 17) in Philadelphia, where he called Phillies games with Richie Ashburn and Harry Kalas. McCarver called games for local sports networks carrying the Phillies from 1980 to 1982, the New York Mets from 1983 to 1998, the New York Yankees from 1999 to 2001, and the San Francisco Giants in 2002.

National broadcasts
McCarver began working as a backup Game of the Week commentator for NBC in 1980. His work at NBC was followed by stints with ABC (where he teamed with Don Drysdale on backup Monday Night Baseball games in 1984 and Al Michaels and Jim Palmer from 1985 to 1989 and again from 1994 to 1995 under the "Baseball Network" umbrella) and CBS (where he teamed with Jack Buck from 1990 to 1991 and Sean McDonough from 1992 to 1993). While at ABC, McCarver also served as a correspondent and play-by-play announcer for freestyle skiing at the 1988 Winter Olympics in Calgary, and he later co-hosted the primetime coverage of 1992 Winter Olympics with Paula Zahn for CBS.

In 1996, McCarver was paired with Joe Buck on the Fox network's MLB telecasts, a role he held from 1996 to 2013. In 2003, McCarver set a record by broadcasting his 13th World Series on national television (surpassing Curt Gowdy). He called 24 World Series for ABC, CBS, and Fox. McCarver announced in March 2013 that he would leave Fox after the 2013 season. His final Fox broadcast was October 30, 2013, as the Boston Red Sox defeated the St. Louis Cardinals in Game 6 to win the 2013 World Series.

Return to local broadcasting
In December 2013, he was hired to be a part-time analyst for the Cardinals on Fox Sports Midwest. He teamed with Dan McLaughlin to call 30 games in the 2014 season. His first game called for the Cardinals was on April 28, 2014, when they hosted the Milwaukee Brewers. After the season, McCarver stated that he had not yet decided whether to come back to the Cardinals' booth in 2015. However, McCarver returned to the Cardinals booth for 40 games in 2015 and continued to call a select number of games each year through 2019. In July 2020, it was announced that McCarver would not be working any telecasts during the team's shortened 2020 season, citing his doctor's recommendations due to health concerns related to the then-ongoing COVID-19 pandemic. In April 2022, McCarver officially announced his retirement from broadcasting.

McCarver also hosted a nationally syndicated sports interview program, The Tim McCarver Show, from 2000 until 2017.

Criticism
During the 1992 National League Championship Series, McCarver criticized Deion Sanders, who also had become an NFL star, for playing two sports—football and baseball—on the same day. For his criticism, on October 14, 1992, after Game 7 had concluded, Sanders dumped a bucket of ice water on McCarver three times while covering the National League pennant-winning Atlanta Braves' clubhouse celebration for CBS. After being doused with the water, McCarver shouted at Sanders, "You are a real man, Deion. I'll say that." Also during the 1992 post-season (when McCarver worked for CBS), Norman Chad criticized McCarver in Sports Illustrated by saying that he's someone who "when you ask him the time, will tell you how a watch works," a reference to McCarver's habit of over-analyzing.

In October 2008, just before the 2008 NLCS, McCarver made public his feelings about Manny Ramirez, calling him "despicable" and criticizing him for his sloppy, lazy play in Boston and how he had suddenly turned it around in Los Angeles. Ramirez declined to comment.

In 2010, McCarver compared the New York Yankees' treatment of former manager Joe Torre to the treatment meted out by Nazi Germany and Stalinist Russia to generals who fell out of favor with their leaders. After receiving negative comments about his position on the topic, McCarver apologized.

Music career
On October 9, 2009, McCarver released a cover album of jazz standards entitled Tim McCarver Sings Songs from the Great American Songbook.

Personal life
McCarver married his high school sweetheart, Anne, on December 29, 1964. They had two daughters.

McCarver died of heart failure in Memphis on February 16, 2023, at age 81.

Awards and honors

Baseball
Two-time World Series champion
Two-time National League All-Star
2010 Irish American Baseball Hall of Fame inductee.

Broadcasting
Three-time Sports Emmy Award winner (Outstanding Sports Event Analyst)
2012 Ford C. Frick Award – National Baseball Hall of Fame

The minor league baseball stadium in Memphis was christened Tim McCarver Stadium in 1978; it was replaced by a new downtown stadium (named AutoZone Park in a naming rights arrangement) in 2000.

Works
Tim McCarver and Bob Levenson (1987). Oh, Baby I Love It! : Baseball Summers, Hot Pennant Races, Grand Salamis, Jellylegs, el Swervos, Dingers, and Dunkers, Random House

See also

 List of St. Louis Cardinals team records
 List of Major League Baseball annual triples leaders
 List of Major League Baseball players who played in four decades

References

External links

 
Tim McCarver Ford C. Frick Award biography at the National Baseball Hall of Fame

1941 births
2023 deaths
Major League Baseball catchers
St. Louis Cardinals players
Philadelphia Phillies players
Boston Red Sox players
Montreal Expos players
National League All-Stars
Baseball players from Memphis, Tennessee
American expatriate baseball players in Canada
Atlanta Crackers players
Keokuk Cardinals players
Rochester Red Wings players
Major League Baseball broadcasters
Philadelphia Phillies announcers
St. Louis Cardinals announcers
New York Mets announcers
New York Yankees announcers
San Francisco Giants announcers
American television sports announcers
Ford C. Frick Award recipients
Sports Emmy Award winners
Olympic Games broadcasters
Fox Sports announcers
American television reporters and correspondents
American television talk show hosts
American television news anchors
University of Memphis alumni
Deaths from congestive heart failure